The following is a list of accolades received by the South African singer Amanda Black.

Awards and nominations

Metro FM Music Awards

!Ref
|-
|rowspan="6"|2017
|rowspan="2"|Amazulu
|Best African Pop Album
|
|rowspan="2"|
|-
|Best Female Album
|
|-
|Herself
|Best New Artist
|
|rowspan="2"|
|-
|"Amazulu"
|Song of the Year
|
|-
|"Separate"
|Best R&B Single
|
|
|-
|Herself
|Listeners Choice Award
|
|

South African Music Awards

!Ref
|-
|rowspan="5"|2017
|Amazulu
|Album of the Year
|
|
|-
|"Amazulu"
|Record of the Year
|
|
|-
|rowspan="2"|Herself
|Best Newcomer of the Year
|
|
|-
|Best Female Artist of the Year
|
|
|-
|Amazulu
|Best R&B Soul Reggae Album
|
|

BET Awards

!Ref
|-
|2017
|Herself
|Viewers Choice: Best International Act
|
|

DStv Mzansi Viewers' Choice Awards

!Ref
|-
|2017
|Herself
|Rising Star
|
|

AFRIMA

!Ref
|-
|rowspan="2"|2017
|Herself
|Best Female Artist Southern Africa
|
|
|-
|Herself
|Best Female Artiste in Inspirational Music
|
|

Nigeria Entertainment Awards

!Ref
|-
|2017
|Herself
|Best African Female Artist (Non Nigerian)
|
|

Dance Music Awards South Africa

!Ref
|-
|2018
|Herself
|Best African Vocalist of the Year
|
|

References

Black, Amanda